Arkansas Highway 166 is a designation for two state highways in Randolph County, Arkansas. The southern segment of  runs from Old Davidsonville State Park to Pocahontas. A northern segment of  runs north from US 62/US 67 to the Missouri state line.

Route description

Davidsonville Historic State Park to Pocahontas

AR 166 begins at Davidsonville Historic State Park in southwest Randolph County. The route runs north to meet US Route 62 in south Pocahontas. The route is entirely two-lane, undivided.

Pocahontas to Missouri
AR 166 begins at US 62/US 67 (Future I-57) in east Pocahontas. The route runs north to meet AR 115 at Stokes and AR 328 in Maynard. AR 166 then trails north through Supply and Minorea to the Missouri state line, where it terminates at Missouri supplemental routes A/Y.

Major intersections
Mile markers reset at concurrencies.

|-
| align=center colspan=5 |  concurrency north, 
|-

See also

 List of state highways in Arkansas

References

External links

166
Transportation in Randolph County, Arkansas